Bjørn Nilsen (born 27 December 1934) is a Norwegian poet and television producer. His literary debut was the poetry collection Hvis jeg var trollmann from 1960. He was a member of the editorial board of the literary magazine Profil, a co-founder of The Norwegian Writers' Center, and a leader of the Norwegian Authors' Union from 1975 to 1977. He worked for the Norwegian Broadcasting Corporation from 1964 to 1992, and as a freelance producer until 1998. He received the Amanda Award for his television documentary Olje in 1988.

References

1934 births
People from Trondheim
20th-century Norwegian novelists
NRK people
Living people